Joseph H. Pierce Jr. (born June 24, 1927 – June 7, 2018) was an American Thoroughbred racehorse owner and trainer who won 2,256 races during his career.

Joseph Pierce Jr. served with the United States Navy during World War II. The son of a horse trainer, Joseph Sr. was widely known as "Slim" and is remembered as the trainer of Chicle II for the Palatine Stable of Frank Rosen. After the War ended, Joseph Jr. learned the business from his father and in 1956 took out his own trainers license. Since the late 1960s he had made Monmouth Park his home base.

References

1927 births
2018 deaths
United States Navy personnel of World War II
American horse trainers
People from Washington, D.C.